The 2022 Washington Mystics season is the franchise's 25th season in the Women's National Basketball Association. The regular season will tip off versus the Indiana Fever on May 6, 2022.

The Mystics won the Draft Lottery and received the 1st Overall pick in the 2022 WNBA Draft, despite only having the third best odds to win. This is the first time in franchise history that the Mystics had the #1 Overall pick.  The team traded the pick to Atlanta and moved down to the third overall pick in the Draft.

The Mystics started the season on a three game winning streak, before losing their first game.  The continued on to win four of their next six games and finished the month of May 7–3.  Their fortunes turned a little in June, with the team not being able to put together a streak of wins and they finished the month 6–6.  The team improved in July, finishing 6–3 and winning five of six in the middle of the month.  The Mystics finished August 3–2, losing two games in the middle but winning the final two games.  Their overall record of 22–14 left them tied for fourth place with Seattle.

Seattle won the tiebreaker for the playoffs, by finishing the regular season 2–1 against the Mystics.  The two teams would meet in the First Round of the 2022 WNBA Playoffs, with Seattle being the fourth seed and Washington being the fifth seed.  The first two games of the series were in Seattle and those were the only two games that were needed out of the possible three game series.  The Mystics lost the first game by three points and the second by thirteen to drop the series 0–2 and end their season.

Transactions

WNBA Draft

Trades and Roster Changes

Roster

Depth

Schedule

Preseason

|- style="background:#fcc;"
| 1
| April 24
| @ Atlanta
| L 69–88
| Shatori Walker-Kimbrough (13)
| Shakira Austin (12)
| Myisha Hines-Allen (7)
| Gateway Center Arena854
| 0–1
|- style="background:#cfc;"
| 2
| April 27
| Minnesota
| W 78–66
| Elena Delle Donne (21)
| Shakira Austin (13)
| Natasha Cloud (4)
| Entertainment and Sports Arena3,220
| 1–1
|- style="background:#ccc;"
| 3
| April 30
| @ New York
| colspan=4 | Canceled
| Barclays Center
| 1–1

Regular Season

|- style="background:#cfc;"
| 1
| May 6
| Indiana
| W 84–70
| Elena Delle Donne (21)
| Elena Delle Donne (9)
| Natasha Cloud (6)
| Entertainment and Sports Arena4,200
| 1–0
|- style="background:#cfc;"
| 2
| May 8
| @ Minnesota
| W 78–66
| Ariel Atkins (20)
| Shakira Austin (10)
| Natasha Cloud (6)
| Target Center8,134
| 2–0
|- style="background:#cfc;"
| 3
| May 10
| Las Vegas
| W 89–76
| Elena Delle Donne (19)
| AtkinsHines-Allen (8)
| Myisha Hines-Allen (8)
| Entertainment and Sports Arena3,082
| 3–0
|- style="background:#fcc;"
| 4
| May 13
| Dallas
| L 86–94
| Elena Delle Donne (20)
| Myisha Hines-Allen (7)
| Rui Machida (7)
| Entertainment and Sports Arena3,281
| 3–1
|- style="background:#cfc;"
| 5
| May 17
| @ Dallas
| W 84–68
| Shakira Austin (20)
| Shakira Austin (8)
| Natasha Cloud (7)
| College Park Center3,035
| 4–1
|- style="background:#cfc;"
| 6
| May 20
| @ Atlanta
| W 78–73
| Ariel Atkins (18)
| Shakira Austin (7)
| Natasha Cloud (5)
| Gateway Center ArenaN/A
| 5–1
|- style="background:#fcc;"
| 7
| May 22
| Chicago
| L 73–82
| Ariel Atkins (20)
| Elena Delle Donne (7)
| Natasha Cloud (10)
| Entertainment and Sports Arena4,200
| 5–2
|- style="background:#cfc;"
| 8
| May 24
| Atlanta
| W 70–50
| Elena Delle Donne (15)
| Shakira Austin (7)
| Natasha Cloud (7)
| Entertainment and Sports Arena2,687
| 6–2
|- style="background:#fcc;"
| 9
| May 28
| @ Connecticut
| L 71–79
| BurkeAtkins (13)
| Shakira Austin (5)
| Natasha Cloud (6)
| Mohegan Sun Arena5,482
| 6–3
|- style="background:#cfc;"
| 10
| May 31
| @ Indiana
| W 87–75
| Ariel Atkins (28)
| Elizabeth Williams (15)
| Natasha Cloud (9)
| Indiana Farmers Coliseum1,009
| 7–3
|-

|- style="background:#fcc;"
| 11
| June 3
| New York
| L 70–74
| Natasha Cloud (17)
| Elena Delle Donne (8)
| Natasha Cloud (8)
| Entertainment and Sports Arena3,857
| 7–4
|- style="background:#fcc;"
| 12
| June 5
| @ Chicago
| L 82–91
| Tianna Hawkins (21)
| Shakira Austin (7)
| Rui Machida (9)
| Wintrust Arena6,228
| 7–5
|- style="background:#cfc;"
| 13
| June 8
| Chicago
| W 84–82
| Ariel Atkins (19)
| Ariel Atkins (7)
| AtkinsCloud (5)
| Entertainment and Sports Arena2,984
| 8–5
|- style="background:#cfc;"
| 14
| June 10
| @ Minnesota
| W 76–59
| Myisha Hines-Allen (17)
| Shakira Austin (13)
| Natasha Cloud (8)
| Target Center6,315
| 9–5
|- style="background:#fcc;"
| 15
| June 12
| Phoenix
| L 90–99 (OT)
| Myisha Hines-Allen (18)
| Myisha Hines-Allen (10)
| Natasha Cloud (7)
| Entertainment and Sports Arena4,200
| 9–6
|- style="background:#cfc;"
| 16
| June 14
| Phoenix
| W 83–65
| Shakira Austin (16)
| Shakira Austin (10)
| Natasha Cloud (10)
| Entertainment and Sports Arena3,088
| 10–6
|- style="background:#fcc;"
| 17
| June 16
| @ New York
| L 65–77
| Natasha Cloud (17)
| Shakira Austin (6)
| Natasha Cloud (7)
| Barclays Center4,168
| 10–7
|- style="background:#cfc;"
| 18
| June 19
| Connecticut
| W 71–63
| Elena Delle Donne (15)
| Shakira Austin (8)
| Ariel Atkins (6)
| Entertainment and Sports Arena3,959
| 11–7
|- style="background:#fcc;"
| 19
| June 21
| @ Los Angeles
| L 82–84
| Ariel Atkins (22)
| Myisha Hines-Allen (8)
| Natasha Cloud (13)
| Crypto.com Arena3,745
| 11–8
|- style="background:#fcc;"
| 20
| June 23
| @ Seattle
| L 71–85
| Elena Delle Donne (20)
| Shakira Austin (9)
| Natasha Cloud (8)
| Climate Pledge Arena9,884
| 11–9
|- style="background:#cfc;"
| 21
| June 25
| @ Las Vegas
| W 87–86 (OT)
| Alysha Clark (20)
| Elena Delle Donne (10)
| Natasha Cloud (10)
| Michelob Ultra Arena7,171
| 12–9
|- style="background:#cfc;"
| 22
| June 28
| Atlanta
| W 92–74
| Natasha Cloud (18)
| AustinHines-Allen (7)
| Rui Machida (5)
| Entertainment and Sports Arena3,517
| 13–9
|-

|- style="background:#fcc;"
| 23
| July 3
| @ Connecticut
| L 72–74 (OT)
| Ariel Atkins (18)
| Myisha Hines-Allen (13)
| Natasha Cloud (6)
| Mohegan Sun Arena5,814
| 13–10
|- style="background:#cfc;"
| 24
| July 6
| @ Atlanta
| W 85–66
| Elena Delle Donne (26)
| Elena Delle Donne (8)
| Natasha Cloud (4)
| Gateway Center Arena1,810
| 14–10
|- style="background:#cfc;"
| 25
| July 12
| @ Los Angeles
| W 94–81
| Elena Delle Donne (26)
| Shakira Austin (8)
| Natasha Cloud (9)
| Crypto.com Arena5,004
| 15–10
|- style="background:#fcc;"
| 26
| July 14
| @ Phoenix
| L 75–80
| Elena Delle Donne (19)
| Elena Delle Donne (12)
| Natasha Cloud (7)
| Footprint Center5,994
| 15–11
|- style="background:#cfc;"
| 27
| July 17
| Minnesota
| W 70–57
| Elena Delle Donne (21)
| Elena Delle Donne (10)
| Natasha Cloud (8)
| Entertainment and Sports Arena4,200
| 16–11
|- style="background:#cfc;"
| 28
| July 21
| New York
| W 78–69
| Elena Delle Donne (25)
| Myisha Hines-Allen (8)
| Shatori Walker-Kimbrough (5)
| Capital One Arena7,431
| 17–11
|- style="background:#cfc;"
| 29
| July 28
| @ Dallas
| W 87–77
| AtkinsCloudHines-Allen (14)
| Shakira Austin (5)
| Natasha Cloud (7)
| College Park Center4,382
| 18–11
|- style="background:#fcc;"
| 30
| July 30
| Seattle
| L 77–82
| Elena Delle Donne (22)
| AustinHines-Allen (10)
| Natasha Cloud (11)
| Entertainment and Sports Arena4,200
| 18–12
|- style="background:#cfc;"
| 31
| July 31
| Seattle
| W 78–75
| Ariel Atkins (23)
| Shakira Austin (9)
| Natasha Cloud (10)
| Entertainment and Sports Arena4,200
| 19–12
|-

|- style="background:#cfc;"
| 32
| August 2
| Las Vegas
| W 83–73
| Natasha Cloud (16)
| Elena Delle Donne (11)
| Natasha Cloud (9)
| Entertainment and Sports Arena4,200
| 20–12
|- style="background:#fcc;"
| 33
| August 5
| @ Chicago
| L 83–93
| Myisha Hines-Allen (21)
| Hines-AllenE. Williams (6)
| Rui Machida (5)
| Wintrust Arena8,042
| 20–13
|- style="background:#fcc;"
| 34
| August 7
| Los Angeles
| L 76–79
| AtkinsHines-Allen (20)
| Shakira Austin (10)
| Natasha Cloud (9)
| Entertainment and Sports Arena4,200
| 20–14
|- style="background:#cfc;"
| 35
| August 12
| @ Indiana
| W 82–70
| Elena Delle Donne (24)
| Shakira Austin (11)
| Natasha Cloud (6)
| Hinkle Fieldhouse1,700
| 21–14
|- style="background:#cfc;"
| 36
| August 14
| Indiana
| W 95–83
| Elena Delle Donne (22)
| Shakira Austin (6)
| Rui Machida (6)
| Entertainment and Sports Arena4,200
| 22–14
|-

Playoffs 

|- style="background:#fcc;"
| 1
| August 18
| @ Seattle
| L 83–86
| Elena Delle Donne (26)
| Shakira Austin (7)
| Elena Delle Donne (5)
| Climate Pledge Arena8,917
| 0–1
|- style="background:#fcc;"
| 2
| August 21
| @ Seattle
| L 84–97
| Natasha Cloud (21)
| Shakira Austin (8)
| Ariel Atkins (7)
| Climate Pledge Arena12,490
| 0–2

Standings

Playoffs

Statistics

Regular Season

‡Waived/Released during the season
†Traded during the season
≠Acquired during the season

Playoffs

Awards and Honors

References

External links 
 Official website of the Washington Mystics

Washington Mystics
Washington Mystics
Washington Mystics seasons